Mustafa Mujezinović (born 6 May 1993) is a Bosnian professional footballer who plays as a winger. He most recently played for Serbian SuperLiga club Novi Pazar.

References

External links

1993 births
Living people
People from Weilburg
Sportspeople from Giessen (region)
Association football wingers
Bosnia and Herzegovina footballers
NK Bosna Visoko players
FK Olimpik players
FK Igman Konjic players
FK Velež Mostar players
FK Željezničar Sarajevo players
First League of the Federation of Bosnia and Herzegovina players
Premier League of Bosnia and Herzegovina players